Aleksandr Dmitriyevich Maksimenko (born 22 March 1996) is a Russian football player.

Club career
He made his debut in the Russian Professional Football League for FC Avangard Kursk on 10 April 2016 in a game against FC Tambov.

He made his debut in the Russian Premier League for FC SKA-Khabarovsk on 9 December 2017 in a game against FC Rubin Kazan and scored a goal on his debut that established the final score (1–3 loss for his club).

Career statistics

References

External links
 Profile by Russian Professional Football League
 
 

1996 births
Sportspeople from Khabarovsk
Living people
Russian people of Ukrainian descent
Russian footballers
Russia youth international footballers
Association football forwards
Association football midfielders
FC Dynamo Moscow reserves players
FC Avangard Kursk players
FC SKA-Khabarovsk players
FC Van players
FC Orsha players
Russian Premier League players
Russian First League players
Russian Second League players
Armenian Premier League players
Belarusian First League players
Russian expatriate footballers
Expatriate footballers in Armenia
Russian expatriate sportspeople in Armenia
Expatriate footballers in Belarus
Russian expatriate sportspeople in Belarus